Ranchi Science Centre is the first science centre in the state of Jharkhand in India, under Jharkhand Council on Science & Technology (JCST) of Department of Science & Technology, Government of Jharkhand (GOJ). The centre comprises two storied building that houses three permanent thematic galleries of covered area 42,000 square meter on an area of 13 acre land, provided by Government of Jharkhand, at Chiraundi village, Morhabadi near the Tagore Hill adjacent to Ranchi town at a capital cost of Rs. 87.5 crore or $1,374,494 which has been shared equally by Government of Jharkhand and Government of India. The science centre has been developed by the National Council of Science Museums (NCSM), a wing of Ministry of Culture, Govt. of India. The centre was inaugurated by the chief minister Arjun Munda on 29 November 2010.

Galleries
 Fun Science
 How Things Work
 Wealth of Jharkhand

Science Park
In 8 acre area, there are several interactive exhibits on simple machines, sound, optics, pendulum and static models of prehistoric animals.

Other facilities

 3D projection theater
 Auditorium
 Car park
 Children's corner
 Computer hall
 Conference room
 Exhibit development laboratory
 Office
 Science demonstration corner
 Science library
 Store
 Taramandal or Inflatable dome portable planetarium
 Temporary exhibition hall

References

Science museums in India
Education in Ranchi
Science centres in India
Buildings and structures in Ranchi
2010 establishments in Jharkhand
Museums in Ranchi
Museums established in 2010